The Commanders–Giants rivalry between the Washington Commanders, formerly known as the Redskins, and the New York Giants of the National Football League began in 1932 with the founding of Washington's predecessors, the Boston Braves, and is the oldest rivalry in the NFC East Division. This rivalry has seen periods of great competition such as the Giants and Redskins' competition for conference and division titles in the late 1930s, early 1940s and 1980s. Experts deem the 1980s as the most hotly contested period between these teams, as the Redskins under Joe Gibbs and the Giants under Bill Parcells competed for division titles and Super Bowls. During this span the two teams combined to win 7 NFC East Divisional Titles, 5 Super Bowls and competed in the 1986 NFC Championship Game with the Giants winning 17–0. This rivalry is storied and  Wellington Mara, long time owner of the Giants, always said that he believed the Redskins were the Giants' truest rival.

In 2012 the rivalry intensified significantly after a special NFL commission headed by Giants owner John Mara imposed a $36 million salary cap penalty on the Redskins (and a smaller one on the Dallas Cowboys) for the organization's approach to structuring contracts in the 2010 NFL season. Previously there was no cap which he publicly claimed was too lenient and should have cost them draft picks. Washington owner Daniel Snyder was convinced that by so disciplining divisional rivals, Mara had abused his league-wide office to advance his own teams' interests. The draft sanctions Mara sought were regarded as especially malicious, as such a punishment voided the pick-laden trade with the St. Louis Rams – completed three days before the cap penalties were announced – to acquire the #2 position used to draft Robert Griffin III). This occurred in the week leading up to Week 13 Monday Night Football showdown eventually won by Washington. Copies of Mara's quote, along with statistics implying that NFL referees were biased in the Giants' favor, were posted throughout the teams' facilities, and a smiling Snyder, within earshot of numerous media personnel, told a team employee that "I hate those motherf***ers" in the victorious locker room after the game.

Notable rivalry moments
 In 1937, their first season in Washington, D.C., the Washington Redskins were set to meet the New York Giants in the season finale in New York City at the Polo Grounds with the winner earning the right to play in the NFL Championship.  The owner of the Washington Redskins, George Preston Marshall, loaded 12,000 fans and a 150 piece marching band onto trains and had them march an impromptu parade through New York City, all the while belting out "Hail to the Redskins".  The tactic appeared to work as the Redskins went on to beat the Giants 49–14, going on to defeat the Chicago Bears in the 1937 NFL Championship.
The Giants paid the Redskins back in 1938 with a 36–0 victory of their own, a win which propelled them to their own victory in the 1938 NFL Championship.
In 1939 the Giants and Redskins again met in the last game of the season.  Having tied in their first meeting 0–0 and having identical records (8–1–1) the two teams were playing for a spot in the NFL Championship game.  The game was very competitive and the Redskins trailed 9–7 in the final moments.  The Redskins attempted a field goal in the last seconds, seemingly giving them a victory.  However, the field goal was called no good allowing the Giants to escape with a victory.  The Redskins were irate, with one player even punching referee Bill Haloran.  The outcome was so controversial that rumor has it George Preston Marshall, the Redskins owner, tried to pull strings to get Haloran fired from his day job as post master of Providence R.I., unsuccessfully. The Giants went on to lose the NFL Championship to the Green Bay Packers 27–0.
On November 27, 1966 the Giants and Redskins participated in the highest combined scoring game in NFL history.  The two teams combined for 16 touchdowns, 9 of which were of 30 yards or more. While the game was an offensive frenzy, the most memorable score was a Redskins field goal attempted with a few seconds remaining and the Giants trailing 69–41.  Otto Graham, the Redskins head coach, claimed it was called merely to allow his kicker practice, but some claim that the field goal was ordered by Redskins middle linebacker and former Giant Sam Huff out of spite.  In either case the final score was 72–41 and with 113 combined points the matchup remains the highest scoring game in league history.
 On November 18, 1985 in a Monday Night Football contest, the Redskins defeated the Giants 23–21. However, the win did not come without a loss as on one play the Redskins ran a flea-flicker, the Giants defense was not fooled by the play and Lawrence Taylor came from the outside and sacked quarterback Joe Theismann. The play is famous as that the sack injured Theismann's leg and effectively ended his career in the NFL. The Redskins missed the playoffs that season.
 On October 27, 1986 in a Monday Night Football game, in what would be a preview of the NFC championship game. the Giants defeated the Redskins 27–20. This was one of two sporting events in the New York City area that night. Across the Hudson River at Shea Stadium in Queens, the New York Mets were wrapping up their second World Series championship with an 8–5 victory over the Boston Red Sox in Game 7 of the fall classic. Game 7 of the World Series had originally been scheduled for the previous night, but was postponed by rain.
 On September 11, 2011 was opening day for the Giants' Super Bowl XLVI championship season of 2011. It also coincided with tenth anniversary of the September 11 attacks; hence the NFL scheduled the Giants and the Redskins to meet that day, as the cities they represent were two metropolitan areas attacked on that day. FedExField was a patriotically and emotionally charged atmosphere as the two rivals took the field. Led by Eli Manning, the Giants took an early 7–0 lead in the first quarter. Washington responded on a Tim Hightower touchdown run in the second. The two teams took a 14–14 tie into halftime. Washington took the lead in the third after Ryan Kerrigan intercepted a pass from Manning and scored. Washington's defense prevented New York from scoring in the second half and the Redskins ended a six-game losing streak to the Giants. The Redskins defeated the Giants at MetLife Stadium in Week 15, their first season sweep of the Giants since 1999.
 On October 21, 2012, the teams met for the first time with Redskins rookie quarterback Robert Griffin III at MetLife Stadium. After trading scores throughout the contest, they began the 4th quarter tied at 13. Following an Ahmad Bradshaw touchdown run, both teams turned the ball over on back to back plays. The Redskins narrowed the lead to 20–16 on a Kai Forbath field goal. Taking over at their own 23, Griffin keyed the go-ahead touchdown drive, including escaping the pass rush of Pro-Bowl defensive end Jason Pierre-Paul on a 4th and 10 before completing a 19-yard pass to backup tight end Logan Paulsen. Griffin capped the drive with a 30-yard touchdown pass to Santana Moss to put the Redskins up 23–20. With the Giants now trailing with under two minutes remaining, Eli Manning, who was outstanding in the fourth quarter throughout the 2011 season, threw a 77-yard touchdown pass to Victor Cruz to retake the lead at 27–23. On the ensuing Redskins drive, Moss fumbled at the Redskins 43 yard-line and the Giants recovered, securing their 27–23 victory.
 On December 3, 2012, in Robert Griffin III's first Monday Night Football appearance, the Redskins came back in the fourth quarter and defeated the Giants 17–16, with Griffin throwing for one score and accidentally creating another when wide receiver Josh Morgan caught his fumble on the fly and ran it into the end zone. The Redskins victory was a part of a critical streak for them to come back from a 3–6 record, this win put them at 6–6, only one game behind the Giants, who they eventually overtook to win the NFC East.
 On September 25, 2016, the winless Redskins visited the undefeated Giants. This game was significant due to the ongoing feud between star wide receiver Odell Beckham Jr. and cornerback Josh Norman. In the previous season, Norman and Beckham had many on-field scrums during a game when Norman played for the Carolina Panthers. The Redskins won by a score of 29–27, sealing the win on an interception by Su'a Cravens. Beckham had an impressive 7 receptions and 121 yards, but was noticeably frustrated by Norman, and was especially apparent when he took his helmet and hit the kicker's practice net on the sidelines, causing it to fall on him. Giants center Weston Richburg was the first to ever be ejected by the new rule of being ejected after two unsportsmanlike penalties, one of which costed Beckham and the Giants a significant play.
 The Redskins enter Week 17 fighting for their playoff chances while the Giants clinched the number 5 seed. The Giants defeated the Redskins 19-10 knocking the Redskins out the playoff contention.
 On November 23, 2017, the Redskins hosted the Giants in their first home Thanksgiving game in franchise history. The game was very defensive throughout, with both teams struggling to get anything going offensively in the first half. In the 3rd quarter, with the game tied 3–3, Kirk Cousins threw a 15-yard touchdown to Jamison Crowder to give the Redskins a 10–3 lead. The Giants tied the game later in the quarter after Janoris Jenkins returned a Cousins' interception 53-yards for a touchdown. The Redskins pulled away late in the fourth quarter with 10 straight points to win 20–10.
 The Giants got their 100th regular season victory over the Redskins on December 9, 2018, winning 40-16 at FedExField.

Game results 

|-
| 
| style="| 
| Tie  0–0
| style="| Braves  14–6
| Braves  1–0–1
| Redskins join NFL as the Boston Braves.  
|-
| 
| Tie 1–1
| style="| Giants  7–0
| style="| Redskins  21–20
| Redskins  2–1–1
| Braves change their name to "Redskins."  Both teams placed in the NFL Eastern division as the league splits into two divisions. Giants lose 1933 NFL Championship.
|-
| 
| style="| 
| style="| Giants  3–0
| style="| Giants  16–3
| Giants  3–2–1
| Giants win 1934 NFL Championship.
|-
| 
| style="| 
| style="| Giants  17–6
| style="| Giants  20–12
| Giants  5–2–1
| Giants lose 1935 NFL Championship.
|-
| 
| Tie 1–1
| style="| Redskins  14–0
| style="| Giants  7–0
| Redskins  6–3–1
| Redskins lose 1936 NFL Championship.
|-
| 
| style="| 
| style="| Redskins  49–14
| style="| Redskins  13–3
| Giants  6–5–1
| Redskins move from Boston to Washington.  Redskins win final game of regular season in New York (a de facto Eastern Division title game), win 1937 NFL Championship.
|-
| 
| style="| 
| style="| Giants  36–0
| style="| Giants  10–7
| Giants  8–5–1
| Giants win 1938 NFL Championship.
|-
| 
| style="| 
| style="| Giants  9–7
| Tie  0–0
| Giants  9–5–2
| Giants win final game of regular season in Washington (a de facto Eastern Division title game), lose 1939 NFL Championship.
|-

|-
| 
| Tie 1–1
| style="| Giants  21–7
| style="| Redskins  21–7
| Giants  10–6–2
| Redskins lose 1940 NFL Championship.
|-
| 
| style="| 
| style="| Giants  20–13
| style="| Giants  17–0
| Giants  12–6–2
| Giants lose 1941 NFL Championship.
|-
| 
| Tie 1–1
| style="| Redskins  14–7
| style="| Giants  14–7
| Giants  13–7–2
| Redskins win 1942 NFL Championship.
|-
| 
| style="| 
| style="| Giants  14–10
| style="| Giants  31–7
| Giants  15–7–2
| Redskins lose 1943 NFL Championship.
|- style="background:#f2f2f2; font-weight:bold;"
|  1943 Playoffs
| style="| 
| style="| Redskins  28–0
| 
|  Giants  15–8–2
|  Eastern Division Playoff game required because the two teams finished tied atop the standings. First postseason meeting in the series.
|-
| 
| style="| 
| style="| Giants  16–13
| style="| Giants  31–0
| Giants  17–8–2
| Giants lose 1944 NFL Championship.
|-
| 
| style="| 
| style="| Redskins  24–14
| style="| Redskins  17–0
| Giants  17–10–2
| Redskins lose 1945 NFL Championship.
|-
| 
| Tie 1–1
| style="| Giants  31–0
| style="| Redskins  24–14
| Giants  18–11–2
| Giants lose 1946 NFL Championship.  Either the Giants or Redskins won the NFL Eastern Division for 14 straight seasons (1933–46).
|-
| 
| Tie 1–1
| style="| Giants  35–10
| style="| Redskins  28–20
| Giants  19–12–2
| 
|-
| 
| style="| 
| style="| Redskins  28–21
| style="| Redskins  41–10
| Giants  19–14–2
| 
|-
| 
| style="| 
| style="| Giants  23–7
| style="| Giants  45–35
| Giants  21–14–2
| 
|-

|-
| 
| style="| 
| style="| Giants  24–21
| style="| Giants  21–17
| Giants  23–14–2
| 
|-
| 
| style="| 
| style="| Giants  28–14
| style="| Giants  35–14
| Giants  25–14–2
| 
|-
| 
| Tie 1–1
| style="| Redskins  27–17
| style="| Giants  14–10
| Giants  26–15–2
| Giants win 7 straight meetings (1949–52).
|-
| 
| style="| 
| style="| Redskins  24–21
| style="| Redskins  13–9
| Giants  26–17–2
| 
|-
| 
| style="| 
| style="| Giants  24–7
| style="| Giants  51–21
| Giants  28–17–2 
| 
|-
| 
| style="| 
| style="| Giants  35–7
| style="| Giants  27–20
| Giants  30–17–2 
| 
|-
| 
| Tie 1–1
| style="| Giants  28–14
| style="| Redskins  33–7
| Giants  31–18–2 
| Giants move to Yankee Stadium, win 1956 NFL Championship.
|-
| 
| Tie 1–1
| style="| Redskins  31–14
| style="| Giants  24–20
| Giants  32–19–2 
| 
|-
| 
| style="| 
| style="| Giants  30–0
| style="| Giants  28–14
| Giants  34–19–2 
| Giants lose 1958 NFL Championship.
|-
| 
| style="| 
| style="| Giants  45–14
| style="| Giants  24–10
| Giants  36–19–2 
| Giants lose 1959 NFL Championship.
|-

|-
| 
| style="| 
| Tie  24–24
| style="| Giants  17–3
| Giants  37–19–3 
| 
|-
| 
| style="| 
| style="| Giants  53–0
| style="| Giants  24–21
| Giants  39–19–3 
| Redskins open Robert F. Kennedy Memorial Stadium (then known as District of Columbia Stadium). Giants' 53–0 win in New York is the largest margin of victory in the series. Giants lose 1961 NFL Championship.
|-
| 
| style="| 
| style="| Giants  49–34
| style="| Giants  42–24
| Giants  41–19–3 
| Giants lose 1962 NFL Championship.
|-
| 
| style="| 
| style="| Giants  44–14
| style="| Giants  24–14
| Giants  43–19–3 
| Giants lose 1963 NFL Championship.
|-
| 
| Tie 1–1
| style="| Giants  13–10
| style="| Redskins  36–21
| Giants  44–20–3 
| Giants win 8 straight meetings (1960–64).
|-
| 
| Tie 1–1
| style="| Redskins  23–7
| style="| Giants  27–10
| Giants  45–21–3 
| 
|-
| 
| Tie 1–1
| style="| Giants  13–10
| style="| Redskins  72–41
| Giants  46–22–3 
| The Redskins' 72–41 win is the highest-scoring game in NFL history by total points (113).
|-
| 
| style="| 
| no game
| style="| Redskins  38–34
| Giants  46–23–3 
| NFL expansion results in a split of each conference into two divisions.  The Redskins are placed in the Capitol Division, while the Giants and New Orleans Saints alternate between the Capitol and Century Divisions each year.  This results in only a single meeting between the Giants and Redskins in 1967 and 1969.
|-
| 
| style="| 
| style="| Giants  48–21
| style="| Giants  13–10
| Giants  48–23–3 
| 
|-
| 
| style="| 
| no game
| style="| Redskins  20–14
| Giants  48–24–3 
| 
|-

|-
| 
| style="| 
| style="| Giants  35–33
| style="| Giants  27–24
| Giants  50–24–3 
| Both teams placed in the NFC East after AFL-NFL merger.
|-
| 
| style="| 
| style="| Redskins  30–3
| style="| Redskins  23–7
| Giants  50–26–3
| 
|-
| 
| style="| 
| style="| Redskins  23–16
| style="| Redskins  27–13
| Giants  50–28–3
| Redskins lose Super Bowl VII.
|-
| 
| style="| 
| style="| Redskins  21–3
| style="| Redskins  27–24
| Giants  50–30–3
| Giants move to the Yale Bowl in New Haven, Connecticut.
|-
| 
| style="| 
| style="| Redskins  13–10
| style="| Redskins  24–3
| Giants  50–32–3
| 
|-
| 
| style="| 
| style="| Redskins  21–13
| style="| Redskins  49–13
| Giants  50–34–3
| Giants home game played at Shea Stadium.
|-
| 
| Tie 1–1
| style="| Giants  12–9
| style="| Redskins  19–17
| Giants  51–35–3
| Giants open Giants Stadium in East Rutherford, New Jersey.  Redskins win 11 straight meetings (1971–76).
|-
| 
| style="| 
| style="| Giants  20–17
| style="| Giants  17–6
| Giants  53–35–3 
| 
|-
| 
| Tie 1–1
| style="| Giants  17–6
| style="| Redskins  16–13(OT)
| Giants  54–36–3
| 
|-
| 
| Tie 1–1
| style="| Giants  14–6
| style="| Redskins  27–0
| Giants  55–37–3
| 
|-

|-
| 
| style="| 
| style="| Redskins  23–21
| style="| Redskins  16–13
| Giants  55–39–3
| 
|-
| 
| Tie 1–1
| style="| Redskins  30–27(OT)
| style="| Giants  17–7
| Giants  56–40–3
|
|-
| 
| style="| 
| style="| Redskins  27–17
| style="| Redskins  15–14
| Giants  56–42–3
| Both games played despite players strike reducing the season to 9 games, Redskins win Super Bowl XVII.
|-
| 
| style="| 
| style="| Redskins  33–17
| style="| Redskins  31-22
| Giants  56–44–3
| Redskins lose Super Bowl XVIII.
|-
| 
| Tie 1–1
| style="| Giants  37–13
| style="| Redskins  30–14
| Giants  57–45–3
| 
|-
| 
| Tie 1–1
| style="| Giants  17–3
| style="| Redskins  23–21
| Giants  58–46–3
| Game in Washington was Joe Theismann's final game.
|-
| 
| style="| 
| style="| Giants  27–10
| style="| Giants  24–14
| Giants  60–46–3 
| Giants win Super Bowl XXI.
|- style="background:#f2f2f2; font-weight:bold;"
|  1986 Playoffs
| style="| 
| style="| Giants  17–0
| 
|  Giants  61–46–3 
|  NFC Championship Game. 
|-
| 
| style="| 
| style="| Redskins  38–12
| style="| Redskins  23–19
| Giants  61–48–3
| Redskins win Super Bowl XXII.
|-
| 
| style="| 
| style="| Giants  27–20
| style="| Giants  24–23
| Giants  63–48–3 
| 
|-
| 
| style="| 
| style="| Giants  20–17
| style="| Giants  27–24
| Giants  65–48–3 
| 
|-

|-
| 
| style="| 
| style="| Giants  21–10
| style="| Giants  24–20
| Giants  67–48–3 
| Giants win Super Bowl XXV.
|-
| 
| style="| 
| style="| Redskins  17–13
| style="| Redskins  34–17
| Giants  67–50–3
| Redskins win Super Bowl XXVI.
|-
| 
| Tie 1–1
| style="| Redskins  28–10
| style="| Giants  24–7
| Giants  68–51–3
| 
|-
| 
| style="| 
| style="| Giants  20–6
| style="| Giants  41–7
| Giants  70–51–3
| 
|-
| 
| style="| 
| style="| Giants  31–23
| style="| Giants  21–19
| Giants  72–51–3
| 
|-
| 
| style="| 
| style="| Giants  20–13
| style="| Giants  24–15
| Giants  74–51–3
| 
|-
| 
| style="| 
| style="| Redskins  31–10
| style="| Redskins  31–21
| Giants  74–53–3
|  
|-
| 
| style="| 
| style="| Giants  30–10
| Tie  7–7(OT)
| Giants  75–53–4
| Redskins open FedEx Field in Landover, Maryland (then known as Jack Kent Cooke Stadium). First tie game in the series since the 1974 introduction of overtime. Giants clinched the NFC East in their home meeting over the Redskins in the penultimate week of the regular season.
|-
| 
| Tie 1–1
| style="| Giants  31–24
| style="| Redskins  21–14
| Giants  76–54–4
| 
|-
| 
| style="| 
| style="| Redskins  50–21
| style="| Redskins  23–13
| Giants  76–56–4
| 
|-

|-
| 
| Tie 1–1
| style="| Redskins  16–6
| style="| Giants  9–7
| Giants  77–57–4
| Giants lose Super Bowl XXXV.
|-
| 
| Tie 1–1
| style="| Giants  23–9
| style="| Redskins  35–21
| Giants  78–58–4
| 
|-
| 
| style="| 
| style="| Giants  19–17
| style="| Giants  27–21
| Giants  80–58–4
| 
|-
| 
| Tie 1–1
| style="| Redskins  20–7
| style="| Giants  24–21(OT)
| Giants  81–59–4
| 
|-
| 
| Tie 1–1
| style="| Giants  20–14
| style="| Redskins  31–7
| Giants  82–60–4
| 
|-
| 
| Tie 1–1
| style="| Giants  36–0
| style="| Redskins  35–20
| Giants  83–61–4
|
|-
| 
| style="| 
| style="| Giants  19–3
| style="| Giants  34–28
| Giants  85–61–4
|
|-
| 
| Tie 1–1
| style="| Redskins  23–10
| style="| Giants  24–17
| Giants  86–62–4
| Giants win Super Bowl XLII.
|-
| 
| style="| 
| style="| Giants  16–7
| style="| Giants  23–7
| Giants  88–62–4
| Game in the Meadowlands was the NFL Kickoff Game.
|-
| 
| style="| 
| style="| Giants  23–17
| style="| Giants  45–12
| Giants  90–62–4
| 
|-

|-
| 
| style="| 
| style="| Giants  31–7
| style="| Giants  17–14
| Giants  92–62–4
| Giants and Jets open MetLife Stadium (then known as New Meadowlands Stadium).
|-
| 
| style="| 
| style="| Redskins  23–10
| style="| Redskins  28–14
| Giants  92–64–4
| Redskins' first season sweep since 1999.  Giants win Super Bowl XLVI.
|-
| 
| Tie 1–1
| style="| Giants  27–23
| style="| Redskins  17–16
| Giants  93–65–4
| 
|-
| 
| style="| 
| style="| Giants  20–6
| style="| Giants  24–17
| Giants  95–65–4
| 
|-
| 
| style="| 
| style="| Giants  24–13
| style="| Giants  45–14
| Giants  97–65–4
| 
|-
| 
| Tie 1–1
| style="| Giants  32–21
| style="| Redskins  20–14
| Giants  98–66–4
| 
|-
| 
| Tie 1–1
| style="| Redskins  29–27
| style="| Giants  19–10
| Giants  99–67–4
| Giants play spoiler with their playoff position locked in and eliminate the Redskins from playoff contention.
|-
| 
| Tie 1–1
| style="| Giants  18–10
| style="| Redskins  20–10
| Giants  100–68–4
| Game in Landover played on Thanksgiving.  Giants record their 100th win over the Redskins, becoming only the second team in NFL history to record 100 wins over a single opponent (joining the Green Bay Packers, who defeated the Detroit Lions for the 100th time the previous season).
|-
| 
| Tie 1–1
| style="| Redskins  20–13
| style="| Giants  40–16
| Giants  101–69–4
| 
|-
| 
| style="| 
| style="| Giants  24–3
| style="| Giants  41–35(OT)
| Giants  103–69–4
| Eli Manning's final season.
|-

|-
| 
| style="| 
| style="| Giants  20–19
| style="| Giants  23–20
| Giants  105–69–4
| No fans in attendance for the game in New York due to the COVID-19 pandemic. Redskins adopt "Washington Football Team" as a temporary nickname.
|-
| 
| style="| 
| style="| Washington  22–7
| style="| Washington  30–29
| Giants  105–71–4
| Washington sweep season series for first time since 2011. Washington's home victory came on a game-winning field goal as time expired after the Giants jumped offside one snap earlier when the initial field goal attempt was missed.
|-
| 
| style="| 
| Tie  20–20(OT)
| style="| Giants  20–12
| Giants  106–71–5
| Washington Football Team adopts the "Commanders" name.
|- 

|-
| Regular season
| style="|Giants 105–70–5
| Giants 56–30–3
| Giants 49–40–2
|
|-
| Postseason
| Tie 1–1
| Tie 1–1
| no games
| NFL Eastern Division playoff: 1943. NFC Championship Game: 1986.
|-
| Regular and postseason 
| style="|Giants 106–71–5
| Giants 57–31–3
| Giants 49–40–2
| 
|-

See also
 Capitals–Rangers rivalry (NHL)
 N.Y. Red Bulls–D.C. United rivalry (MLS)

References

National Football League rivalries
Washington Commanders
New York Giants
New York Giants rivalries
Washington Commanders rivalries